Ian Pollack may refer to:
Ian F. Pollack, American physician
Ian Pollack, from The Amazing Race 3